Warren Powers Laird, FAIA (August 8, 1861 – February 18, 1948) was an American architect from Minnesota. He was Dean of the School of Fine Arts of the University of Pennsylvania from 1920 to his retirement in 1932.

Biography
Laird was born in Winona, Minnesota, on August 8, 1861. He attended public schools in Winona, followed by study at the Winona Normal School. From 1885 to 1887, Laird took an architecture course at Cornell University. He then practiced for six years in architectural offices in Minnesota, Boston, and New York City, then studied in Paris. Near the end of his Cornell coursework, he was named an instructor of architecture. In January 1891, he was named a Professor of Architecture at the University of Pennsylvania.

In 1911, Laird was awarded an honorary Doctor of Science by Pennsylvania. He was elevated to Dean of the School of Fine Arts there in 1920. He retired in 1932 and was named professor emeritus. Laird frequently consulted for state and municipal governments. He was on the national advisory council of Lingnan University in Canton, China, and was a trustee there for seventeen years. He served on the architectural jury of the art competitions at the 1932 Summer Olympics.

Laird married Clara Elizabeth Tuller on November 15, 1893. They had two children: Mary Hall and Helen Powers, the latter not surviving to adulthood. Laird served a term as president of the Fine Arts League of Philadelphia and served the American Institute of Architects on its Committee of Education. He died at his home in Bryn Mawr, Pennsylvania, on February 18, 1948.

Works
Winona Free Public Library (1899), Winona, Minnesota
Stock Pavilion (1908) (with Paul Philippe Cret), Madison, Wisconsin
Winona Masonic Temple (1909), Winona
Lathrop Hall (1910) (with Cret), Madison
Agricultural Chemistry Building (1912) (with Cret), Madison

References

1861 births
1948 deaths
Architects from Minnesota
Architects from Pennsylvania
Cornell University College of Architecture, Art, and Planning alumni
Cornell University faculty
University of Pennsylvania faculty
People from Winona, Minnesota
People from Bryn Mawr, Pennsylvania
Fellows of the American Institute of Architects